Dicentria violascens is a moth of the family Notodontidae. It has been recorded from Mexico south to Brazil. However, violascens is a species complex of at least six cryptic species.

References

Moths described in 1855
Notodontidae